Trend Micro Internet Security (known as PC-cillin Internet Security in Australia and Virus Buster in Japan) is an antivirus and online security program developed by Trend Micro for the consumer market. According to NSS Lab comparative analysis of software products for this market in 2014, Trend Micro Internet Security was fastest in responding to new internet threats.

In addition to anti-malware and web threat protection, the premium version of this software includes compatibility for PCs, Macs, Android or iOS mobile devices; parental controls; identity theft prevention; a privacy scanner for major social networking sites; and 25 GB of cloud storage.

Features
Features in Trend Micro Internet Security 2015 include:
Antivirus 
Antispyware 
Antispam 
Email safety scan
Two-way firewall 
Website authentication
Home network protection
Parental controls and filtering

The software also includes:
Protection against rootkits
Proactive intrusion blocking
Personal data leak prevention

Trend Micro Premium Security includes additional features, including: 
Wireless network validation
keylogger protection
Online data backup
Remote file and folder permissions control
PC tuning and cleanup
Security programs for mobile devices that run on Android, Symbian, and Windows Mobile operating systems
Cloud storage (25 GB)

Effectiveness
AV-Comparatives awarded Trend Micro a three-star Advanced + rating–the highest ranking given by the organization–in AV-Comparatives’ Whole Product Dynamic “Real-World” Protection Test for 2014.

AV-TEST in October 2014 gave Trend Micro Internet Security 2015 a score of 17 out of a possible 18 points.

Trend Micro Maximum Security scored the highest success rate in blocking malware downloads in NSS Labs’ 2014 Consumer Endpoint Protection test focused on Socially Engineered Malware. The results were based on continuous series of tests to determine the participants’ effectiveness against socially engineered malware. NSS Labs is an independent network testing facility, security and consultancy organization. NSS Labs also found that Trend Micro had the quickest time in adding protection against unknown threats - less than 15 minutes.

In January 2016 it was discovered that the consumer version of Trend Micro AV allowed any website visited by its users to execute arbitrary code or read all browser passwords on the Windows PC it purportedly protected. A patch was later issued to close the issue.

Mobile Security
In June 2014, AV-Test published results for its mobile security endurance tests, which assessed more than 30 apps over a six-month period. Trend Micro's mobile security tied for the highest overall score of 13 out of 13 points.

Version history
Previous versions include:
PC-cillin
PC-cillin 2
PC-cillin 95
PC-cillin 2000
PC-cillin 2002
PC-cillin 2003
PC-cillin Internet Security v11/2004
PC-cillin Internet Security v12/2005
PC-cillin Internet Security v14/2006
Trend Micro Internet Security v15/2007
Trend Micro Internet Security v16/2008
Trend Micro Internet Security v17/2009
Trend Micro Internet Security v18/2010
Trend Micro Titanium Internet Security v19/2011
Trend Micro Titanium Internet Security v20/2012
Trend Micro Titanium Internet Security v21/2013
Trend Micro Titanium Internet Security v22/2014
Trend Micro Internet Security v23/2015

As of January 2015, Trend Micro supported Trend Micro Internet Security versions 19/2011 and higher.

PC-cillin 2000 and earlier versions were virus scanners without any additional features. PC-cillin 2002 and 2003 were stand-alone virus scanners which also included a firewall component and improved on the software's scanning and virus detection engine. 
Newer versions of Trend Micro Internet Security offer additional features such as spyware protection, antispam and an integrated firewall along with an improved scanning and virus detection engine and enhanced heuristics. PC-cillin 2003 was the last stand-alone antivirus product offered by Trend Micro until 2007, when the company released a standalone anti-malware product that offered protection from malicious software including viruses, spyware, and adware.

See also 

 Antivirus software
 Internet Security
 Comparison of antivirus software
 Comparison of computer viruses

References

External links
 Trend Micro HomePage

Antivirus software
Firewall software
Computer security software
Security software